The Tasmanian Government Railways J class was a one locomotive class of  steam locomotives operated by the Tasmanian Government Railways. It was known as Hagan's Patent.

History
To operate trains on the North East Dundas Tramway, the Tasmanian Government Railways purchased a locomotive from Maschinenfabrik Christian Hagans, Erfurt in 1901. The locomotive had an articulated  wheel arrangement. Its weight played havoc with the light rails it ran over and in 1910 it was replaced by the K class.

References

Railway locomotives introduced in 1901
Steam locomotives of Tasmania
2 ft gauge locomotives